First Wives' Club is a 2007 South Korean drama series starring Kim Hye-sun, Kim Hae-sook, Oh Hyun-kyung, Ahn Nae-sang, Lee Joon-hyuk and Son Hyun-joo. The weekend drama aired on SBS from September 29, 2007 to October 5, 2008 on Saturdays and Sundays at 21:45 for 104 episodes.

Cast
Kim Hyeseon as Han Bok-soo
Kim Hae-sook as Ahn Yang-soon
Oh Hyun-kyung as Na Hwa-shin
Oh Dae-gyu as Lee Ki-jeok (Bok-soo's husband)
Park In-hwan as Lee Hwa-sang (Ki-jeok's father)
Han Jin-hee as Han Shim-han (Yang-sun's husband)
Ahn Nae-sang as Han Won-soo (Hwa-shin's husband)
Kang Yi-seok as Chul (Won-soo and Hwa-shin's son)
Son Hyun-joo as Gil-eok
Byun Jung-min as Jung Na-mi (Gil-eok's wife)
Lee Mi-young as Bok Boon-ja
Lee Joon-hyuk as Han Sun-soo
Yoo Ha-na as Choi Hyun-shil
Kim Hee-jung as Mo Ji-ran
Jang Da-yoon as Jin-joo (Ji-ran's daughter)
Kim Ha-kyun as Mr. Kam (Ji-ran's husband)
Lee Sang-woo as Koo Se-joo
Yoon Joo-hee as Bang Hae-ja / Director Bang (fashion department)
Yoo Seung-bong as Chairman Koo (Se-joo's father)
Lee Il-hwa as Jo Yong-hee (doctor, Ki-jeok's old classmate)
On Jo as Pan Mae-soon
Okabe Tomoaki as Kang Go-joo
Yoo Se-rye as Hong Bo-hae
Son Jong-bum as Mr. Jong (Gil-eok's friend)
Roh Joo-hyun as Mayor Choi (Hyun-shil's father)
Hong Soon-chang as Baek Won-man (small hospital director)

Awards and nominations

International broadcast
The series also aired in Singapore on MediaCorp Channel 8, and in the Philippines in 2010 on TV5.

References

External links
  
 

Seoul Broadcasting System television dramas
2007 South Korean television series debuts
2008 South Korean television series endings
Korean-language television shows
South Korean romance television series
Television series by Samhwa Networks